The 1902 Wimbledon Championships took place on the outdoor grass courts at the All England Lawn Tennis and Croquet Club in Wimbledon, London, United Kingdom. The tournament ran from 23 June until 2 July. It was the 26th staging of the Wimbledon Championships, and the first Grand Slam tennis event of 1902. The Women's final (challenge round) is the only match in the history of Wimbledon that was played twice over. Charlotte Cooper Sterry played Muriel Robb in miserable weather conditions, and the match was abandoned with the score at 6–4, 11–13. The match was restarted afresh the next day, and Muriel Robb won the rematch 7–5, 6–1.

It was also the Wimbledon’s 25th anniversary of the staging of the Wimbledon Tennis Championships.

Finals

Men's singles

 Laurence Doherty defeated  Arthur Gore 6–4, 6–3, 3–6, 6–0

Women's singles

 Muriel Robb defeated  Charlotte Sterry 7–5, 6–1

Men's doubles

 Frank Riseley /  Sydney Smith defeated  Laurence Doherty /  Reginald Doherty 4–6, 8–6, 6–3, 4–6, 11–9

References

External links
 Official Wimbledon Championships website

 
Wimbledon Championships
Wimbledon Championships
Wimbledon Championships
Wimbledon Championships